FK Yenisey Krasnoyarsk (ФК Енисей Красноярск) is a Russian football club based in Krasnoyarsk. The club plays in the Russian First League.

History
The club was founded in 1937 as Lokomotiv Krasnoyarsk and spent one season in Class D of the Soviet league. In 1957 the club was re-formed and entered the Far East zone of Class B. In 1968 Lokomotiv was renamed Rassvet and, in 1970, Avtomobilist. In 1991 it became Metallurg, a title it held until February 2010 when it was renamed Metallurg-Yenisey (formally, Metallurg was excluded from the league and a new independent club Metallurg-Yenisey was admitted into the league). In 2011, the club was renamed to Yenisey. The club is named after the Yenisei river, on which Krasnoyarsk is located.

Yenisey (or their predecessors) never played in the Soviet Top League or Russian Premier League until 2018. Their best result in Soviet League was a 2nd position in Group 7 of Class B in 1959, while their best result in Russian history is the 3rd position in Russian National Football League in 2016–17 and 2017–18. Since the end of the Soviet Union the club has suffered relegation to the Second Division on five occasions, most recently in 2006. In the 2015–16 season, Yenisey took 16th spot in the FNL and should have been relegated, but one of the third-tier Russian Professional Football League zone winners, FC Smena Komsomolsk-na-Amure, refused to be promoted due to lack of financing, and Yenisey stayed in the FNL. At the end of the 2016–17 season, Yenisey reached the Russian Premier League promotion play-offs, but lost to FC Arsenal Tula on away goals rule (2–1 at home, 0–1 away) and stayed in the FNL. Despite spending a portion of the next 2017–18 season in the top-two direct-promotion spot, by the end of the season Yenisey dropped into 3rd position and qualified for promotion play-offs again. They defeated FC Anzhi Makhachkala 6–4 on aggregate in the promotion play-offs and were promoted to the Russian Premier League for the 2018–19 season for the first time in team's history.

They were relegated back to the second tier after one year in the Premier League.

Domestic history

Current squad
As of 21 February 2023, according to the Official First League website.

Reserve team

Notable players
Had international caps for their respective countries. Players whose name is listed in bold represented their countries while playing for Yenisey.

Russia/USSR
 Nikita Chernov
 Lyubomir Kantonistov
 Oleg Romantsev
 Roman Sharonov
 Aleksandr Sobolev
 Aleksandr Tarkhanov
  Vladimir Tatarchuk
 Ivan Varlamov

Former USSR countries
 Barsegh Kirakosyan
 Artur Sarkisov
 Aleksey Isayev
 Vladimir Putrash
 Gennady Tumilovich
 Valeri Korobkin
 Almir Mukhutdinov
 Valery Kichin
 Edgars Gauračs

 Konstantīns Igošins
 Oļegs Laizāns
 Valentīns Lobaņovs
 Serghei Alexeev
 Victor Bulat
 Valeriu Ciupercă
 Wladimir Baýramow
 Dmytro Tyapushkin
 Ihor Zhabchenko

Europe
 Enis Gavazaj
 Petar Zanev
Africa
 Fegor Ogude

Coaching Staff

References

External links
  

 
Association football clubs established in 1937
Football clubs in Russia
Sport in Krasnoyarsk
1937 establishments in Russia